Paul Kurt "Poul" Bassett (born December 17, 1928) is a retired Canadian-born Danish football forward. He had a long career in Denmark, and played in the 1960 European Cup, scoring 1 goal, for Boldklubben 1909. He was born in Saskatchewan.

References

Canadian soccer players
Danish men's footballers
1928 births
Living people
Association football forwards
Soccer people from Saskatchewan